Eugen Cornelius Joseph von Lommel (19 March 1837, Edenkoben – 19 June 1899, Munich) was a German physicist. He is notable for the Lommel polynomial, the Lommel function, the Lommel–Weber function, and the Lommel differential equation.  He is also notable as the doctoral advisor of the Nobel Prize winner Johannes Stark.

Lommel was born in Edenkoben in the Palatinate, Kingdom of Bavaria. He studied mathematics and physics at the University of Munich between 1854 and 1858. From 1860 to 1865 he is teacher of physics and chemistry at the canton school of Schwyz. From 1865 to 1867 he taught at the high school in Zürich and was simultaneously Privatdozent at the local university as well as at the polytechnic school. From 1867 to 1868, he was appointed professor of physics at the University of Hohenheim. Finally he was appointed to a chair of experimental physics at Erlangen in 1868 and then went to the University of Munich in 1886, where he died in 1899.

Works by Lommel
 Studien über die Besselschen Funktionen, (Leipzig 1868)
 Wind und Wetter, München (1873)
 Das Wesen des Lichts, Leipzig (1874)
 Über die Interferenz des gebeugten Lichts, Erlangen (1874–76)
 Lexikon der Physik und Meteorologie, Leipzig (1882)
 Die Beugungserscheinungen geradlinig begrenzter Schirme, München (1886)
 Die Beugungsrescheinungen einer kreisrunden Öffnung, München (1884)
 Lehrbuch der Experimentalphysik, Leipzig (8. A. 1902)

External links

References
 Robert Knott: Lommel, Eugen. In: Allgemeine Deutsche Biographie (ADB). Band 52, Duncker & Humblot, Leipzig 1906, S. 62–65.

1837 births
1899 deaths
People from Edenkoben
19th-century German physicists
People from the Palatinate (region)
Ludwig Maximilian University of Munich alumni
Academic staff of the Ludwig Maximilian University of Munich
Academic staff of ETH Zurich
Academic staff of the University of Erlangen-Nuremberg